Beta Volantis, Latinized from β Volantis, is the brightest star of the southern constellation of Volans. It has an apparent visual magnitude of 3.75, which is sufficiently bright to allow it to be viewed with the naked eye. Based upon an annual parallax shift of 30.33 mas as seen from Earth, its distance can be estimated as 107.5 light years from the Sun. The star is moving away from the Sun with a radial velocity of +27 km/s.

This is a single, orange-hued star with a stellar classification of K2 III, indicating it is an evolved K-type giant star. It is a red clump star, which means it is on the horizontal branch and is generating energy through helium fusion at its core. The stellar mass has been estimated via astroseismology, giving a value of 1.6 times the mass of the Sun. It is radiating about 41 times the Sun's luminosity from its enlarged photosphere at an effective temperature of 4,546 K.

References

K-type giants
Horizontal-branch stars
Volantis, Beta
Volans (constellation)
Durchmusterung objects
3499
071878
041312
3347